Mohammed Touchassie (born October 20, 2001) is a Dutch-Moroccan  kickboxer, currently competing in the welterweight division of Enfusion, where he is the current champion. As of May 2022 he was the #6 ranked welterweight in the world by Combat Press.

Kickboxing career

Enfusion

Early career
Touchassie faced Josef Vít at Prague Fight Night on June 27, 2019. He won the fight by a third-round stoppage, forcing the referee to intervene after flooring Vít with a high knee.

Touchassie faced Damian Ori at Enfusion Cage Events 3 on September 25, 2020. He won the fight by a second-round knockout, after flooring Ori with a head kick early in the round.

Touchassie faced Mischa Eradus at Enfusion 100 on July 4, 2021. He won the fight by a second-round knockout.

Touchassie returned to Enfusion's cage fighting series in order to face Joe Johnson at Enfusion Cage Events 6 on September 3, 2021. He won the fight by a third-round knockout.

Touchassie faced the Glory veteran Remy "Robocop" Vectol at Enfusion 104 on November 12, 2021. He won the fight by a second-round stoppage.

Touchassie faced Bilal Bakhouche-Chareuf at Enfusion 105 on March 26, 2022. He won the fight by a second-round knockout.

Enfusion Welterweight champion
Touchassie faced the former 80 kg Enfusion champion Robin Ciric for the vacant Enfusion Welterweight World Championship at Enfusion 109 on June 18, 2022. He captured the inaugural title by unanimous decision.

Touchassie challenged the Fair Fight Welterweight (-77 kg) champion Maxim Sulgin at RCC Fair Fight 20 on February 18, 2023. He won the fight by majority decision.

Touchassie faced Soufian-Aoulad Abdelkhalek in the Last 16 of the 8TKO -80 kg tournament on March 18, 2023. He won the fight by a third-round knockout.

Touchassie faced the WAKO-Pro K-1 Super Middleweight champion Nikola Todorović in the semifinals of the Marrakesh Kickboxing welterweight tournament.

Titles and accomplishments
Enfusion
 2022 Enfusion Welterweight World Champion
 One successful title defense

RCC Fair Fight
 2023 Fair Fight Welterweight Champion

Kickboxing record

|- align="center" bgcolor=""
| 2023-06-15 || ||align=left| Nikola Todorović || Marrakech Kickboxing, Tournament Semifinals || Marrakech, Morocco ||  ||  || 

|- align="center" bgcolor="#cfc"
| 2023-03-18 || Win ||align=left| Soufian-Aoulad Abdelkhalek || 8TKO - 80kg Last 16  || Alkmaar, Netherlands || KO (Punches) || 3 || 2:14

|-  style="background:#cfc;"
| 2023-02-18 || Win ||align=left| Maxim Sulgin || RCC Fair Fight 20 || Yekaterinburg, Russia || Decision (Unanimous) || 5 || 3:00 
|-
! style=background:white colspan=9 |

|- align="center" bgcolor="#cfc"
| 2022-12-16 || Win ||align=left| Abdallah Al Jabareen || Enfusion 117 || Dubai, United Arab Emirates || KO (Left hook) || 2 || 1:49
|-
|- align="center" bgcolor="#cfc"
| 2022-11-05 || Win ||align=left| Dominik Bereczki || Enfusion 114 || Amsterdam, Netherlands || KO (Knee to the body) || 3 || 2:10
|-
|- align="center" bgcolor="#cfc"
| 2022-09-24 || Win ||align=left| Soufiane el Ballouti || Enfusion 112 || Eindhoven, Netherlands || Decision (Unanimous) || 5 || 3:00 
|-
! style=background:white colspan=9 |
|- align="center" bgcolor="#cfc"
| 2022-06-18 || Win ||align=left| Robin Ciric || Enfusion 109 || Groningen, Netherlands || Decision (Unanimous) || 5||3:00 
|-
! style=background:white colspan=9 |
|-  style="background:#cfc;"
| 2022-05-14 || Win ||align=left| Hamid Rezaie || Enfusion 106 || Arnhem, Netherlands || KO (Right hook) || 1 || 1:06
|-
|-  style="background:#cfc;"
| 2022-03-26 || Win ||align=left| Bilal Bakhouche-Chareuf || Enfusion 105 || Alkmaar, Netherlands || TKO (Punches to the body) || 2 || 0:51
|-
|-  style="background:#cfc;"
| 2021-11-12 || Win ||align=left| Remy Vectol || Enfusion 104 || Abu Dhabi, United Arab Emirates || TKO (Punches) || 2 || 0:51
|-
|-  style="background:#cfc;"
| 2021-09-03 || Win ||align=left| Joe Johnson || Enfusion Cage Events 6 || Alkmaar, Netherlands || TKO (Corner stoppage) || 3 || 0:44
|-
|-  style="background:#cfc;"
| 2021-07-04 || Win ||align=left| Mischa Eradus || Enfusion 100 || Alkmaar, Netherlands || TKO (Left hook to the body) || 2 || 0:35
|-
|-  style="background:#cfc;"
| 2020-09-27 || Win ||align=left| Damian Ori || Enfusion Cage Events 3 || Alkmaar, Netherlands || KO (Head kick) || 2 || 0:10
|-
|-  style="background:#cfc;"
| 2020-09-19 || Win ||align=left| Barry van Diemen || Enfusion 97 || Alkmaar, Netherlands || TKO  || 2 ||

|-  style="background:#cfc;"
| 2019-06-27 || Win ||align=left| Josef Vít || Prague Fight Night || Prague, Czech Republic || KO (Knee) || 3 || 1:44
|-
| colspan=9 | Legend:    

|- style="background:#cfc;"
| 2019-10-25 || Win ||align=left| Branko de Gouw ||  Fightclub Den Haag ||  Netherlands || Decision || 3 || 3:00
|-
|- style="background:#cfc;"
| 2019-04-06 || Win ||align=left| Hamza el Mesbahi ||  RHJC Promotions || Noordwijkerhout, Netherlands || Decision || 3 || 3:00
|-
|- style="background:#cfc;"
| 2018-11-03 || Win ||align=left| Quint Otten || GLOBAL FIGHTS II ||  The Hague, Netherlands || Decision || 3 || 2:00
|-
|- style="background:#cfc;"
| 2018-04-25 || Win ||align=left| Mohamed Bitbirnn || HITTEAM 5 ||  The Hague, Netherlands || Decision || 3 || 2:00
|-
|- style="background:#cfc;"
| 2017-10-29 || Win ||align=left| Achmed Akoudad || FEARLESS 5 ||  Wassenaar, Netherlands || Decision || 3 || 2:00
|-
| colspan=9 | Legend:

See also
 List of male kickboxers

References

2001 births
Living people
Dutch male kickboxers
Moroccan male kickboxers
Welterweight kickboxers
Dutch sportspeople of Moroccan descent
Sportspeople from Rotterdam